Athyma cama, the orange staff sergeant, is a species of nymphalid butterfly found in tropical and subtropical Asia.

Subspecies
The subspecies of Athyma cama found in India are-
 Athyma cama cama Moore, 1857 – Himalayan Orange Staff Sergeant

References

Cited references

Athyma
Fauna of Pakistan
Butterflies of Asia
Butterflies of Indochina
Butterflies described in 1858